In the field of linguistics, polygenesis is the view that human languages evolved as several lineages independent of one another. It is contrasted with monogenesis, which is the view that human languages all go back to a single common ancestor. 

Polygenesis is not to be confused with the wave theory, originally propounded by Johannes Schmidt.

See also
Polygenism
August Schleicher
Ernst Haeckel

Historical linguistics
Evolution of language
Linguistic theories and hypotheses